Verlyn Dale Olson  (born February 4, 1954) is a Canadian politician and lawyer. He served as a member of the Alberta Legislature from 2008 to 2015 and was a cabinet minister from 2011 until 2015.

Political career
Olson first ran for a seat to the House of Commons of Canada in the Crowfoot electoral district in the 2000 Canadian federal election under the federal Progressive Conservative banner. He was defeated by Kevin Sorenson in a landslide that also saw incumbent Jack Ramsay get defeated.

Olson ran for seat to the Alberta Legislature in the 2008 provincial election and was elected to represent the electoral district of Wetaskiwin-Camrose in the Legislative Assembly of Alberta. He is a member of the provincial Progressive Conservatives.

Olson succeeded Alison Redford as Alberta's Minister of Justice and Attorney General on February 18, 2011. He was appointed Minister of Agriculture for Alberta on May 8, 2012.

He was appointed acting Minister of Justice and Attorney General on April 25, 2015, in the middle of the election campaign, upon the sudden resignation of Jonathan Denis. He was defeated in the 2015 Alberta general election by NDP candidate Bruce Hinkley.

Private life
Verlyn was born and raised in Camrose. He and his wife, Mardell Olson, have three adult children and four grandchildren.

Community involvement
Olson's history of community involvement includes coaching local baseball and hockey and membership with the following organizations:

Viking Cup International Hockey Tournament Steering Committee, The Bethany Group (Health Care/Seniors Housing Board), Alberta Motion Picture Development Corporation Board,
Camrose Sport Development Society, Armena Athletic Association, Camrose Lutheran College Corporation (Augustana University College) Board of Regents.

References

External links
 Alberta government members directory

Progressive Conservative Association of Alberta MLAs
Living people
Place of birth missing (living people)
Alberta candidates for Member of Parliament
Members of the Executive Council of Alberta
Progressive Conservative Party of Canada candidates for the Canadian House of Commons
Candidates in the 2000 Canadian federal election
People from Camrose, Alberta
1954 births
21st-century Canadian politicians